Roman Sikorski (July 11, 1920 – September 12, 1983) was a Polish mathematician.

Biography
Sikorski was a professor at the University of Warsaw from 1952 until 1982. Since 1962, he was a member of the Polish Academy of Sciences.

Sikorski's research interests included: Boolean algebras, mathematical logic, functional analysis, the theory of distributions, measure theory, general topology, and descriptive set theory.

Works

 Boolean Algebras (1960)
 Funkcje rzeczywiste (t. 1–2 1958–59)
 The Mathematics of Metamathematics (1963, together with Helena Rasiowa)
 Rachunek rózniczkowy i całkowy — funkcje wielu zmiennych (1967)

See also
 Warsaw School of Mathematics

References
 Roman Sikorski (11 July 1920–12 September 1983), Studia Mathematica, 78(1984), 105.
 M. Maczynski, T. Traczyk: Roman Sikorski (1920–1983), Wiadom. Mat., 27(2), 1987, 235–241.

1920 births
1983 deaths
Warsaw School of Mathematics
University of Warsaw alumni